The COVID-19 pandemic in Algeria is part of the worldwide pandemic of coronavirus disease 2019 caused by severe acute respiratory syndrome coronavirus 2. The virus was confirmed to have spread to Algeria in February 2020. In December it was announced that Algeria intended to launch COVID-19 vaccinations in January 2021.



Background 
On 12 January, the World Health Organization (WHO) confirmed that a novel coronavirus was the cause of a respiratory illness in a cluster of people in Wuhan City, Hubei Province, China, who had initially come to the attention of the WHO on 31 December 2019.

Unlike SARS of 2003, the case fatality ratio for COVID-19 has been much lower, but the transmission has been significantly greater, with a significant total death toll.

Timeline

February 2020 
 On 25 February, Algeria laboratory-confirmed its first case of severe acute respiratory syndrome coronavirus 2 (SARS-CoV-2), an Italian man who arrived on 17 February; on 28 February, Algeria deported him back to Italy, via a special flight from Hassi Messaoud Airport where he was subject to quarantine.

March 2020 

 On 2 March, Algeria confirmed two new cases of SARS-CoV-2, a woman and her daughter, the health ministry said.
 On the afternoon of 3 March, Algeria reported another two new cases of SARS-CoV-2, which brought the total number of confirmed cases to five, a state news agency said quoting a statement from the health ministry. The statement added that the two new cases are from the same family, a father and daughter, and were living in France, adding that there's an investigation to determine the identities of the people who were in contact with them. The Ministry of Health announced on the evening of 3 March that three new cases of SARS-CoV-2 had been registered in Algeria, all from the same family, bringing the total number of cases to eight. On 4 March, the Ministry of Health recorded 4 new confirmed cases of SARS-CoV-2, from the same family, bringing the total number of cases to 12.
 On 7 March, a 20th case, an Algerian who had stayed in Spain was announced.
 On 12 March, five new cases of COVID-19, including one death, aged 78 and placed in isolation at Blida hospital. Two cases having stayed in France, one in the Souk-Ahras province, the other in the Tizi-Ouzou province and three in that of Blida province. the total number of confirmed cases is 26 adding a woman in of Skikda having stayed in France was announced, and a send death coaged 55 is recorded without indication of the place of residence. On the same day, schools were locked due to the coronavirus spread.
 On 13 March, a new case confirmed in Algiers, a 36-year-old Algerian who stayed in France.
 On 14 March, the Algerian's Ministry of Health announced 10 new confirmed cases with the COVID-19 coronavirus and one death. This is the third death that resides in Blida. It is a 51-year-old woman from Blida. With this new case, the total number of cases registered in Algeria reached 37 confirmed cases and 3 deaths. The ministry also said 12 confirmed cases left containment after healing.
 On 15 March, The Prime Minister Abdelaziz Djerad said that "45 cases have been confirmed by the Pasteur Institute of Algeria ..." Eleven new cases of contamination with the coronavirus were confirmed, including one death, a woman aged 84 years in of Blida, the total number of cases recorded in Algeria reached forty-eight confirmed cases and four deaths. In the evening, a new confirmed case was registered in the Adrar Province.
 On 16 March, six new confirmed cases of COVID-19, these are two cases in Algiers, one case in the Bouïra Province, one case in the Bordj Bou Arréridj Province, one case in the Tizi Ouzou Province and a case in the Annaba Province.
 On 17 March, a fifth death was recorded in the Blida Province, a 51-year-old man with chronic condition. In the Béjaïa Province, a first confirmed case. and a case in the  Skikda Province.
 On 18 March, a sixth death was registered in the Blida Province, a 62-year-old man died on 17 March. eight new cases bringing the total number of confirmed cases to 75. Another new death (7th) in El Oued Province.
 On 19 March, ten new confirmed cases of the COVID-19, including two new deaths, to reach a total of 82 confirmed cases including eight deaths. The same day, a ninth death is recorded in the Médéa Province, a 47-year-old man (Former Algerian judo player Othman Tijani)
 On 20 March, a tenth death was recorded in Algeria in El Oued Province, it is the sister of the first case of Province. The death (11th) of a 77-year-old woman  has been announced in Azeffoun, Tizi-Ouzou Province, bringing the death toll from the virus to 11 in Algeria. and another (12 th) in Khenchela Province, an 85-year-old man. Anti-government protests were called off for the first time in over a year.
 On 21 March, the balance sheet was 139 confirmed cases, including 78 in the  Blida Province, 6 in Oran Province and a first confirmed case in Relizane Province 46. 15 deaths, including eight deaths in of Blida Province.
 On 22 March, the Algerian Minister of Health, Abderrahmane Benbouzid, announced that "Algeria has entered the third phase of the coronavirus epidemic and, therefore, we must prepare for the worst". The assessment of the day according to the commission for monitoring the evolution of the epidemic, amounted to 201 confirmed cases and 17 deaths. 62 confirmed cases and two additional deaths compared to the last assessment. The two new deaths are recorded, one in of Béjaïa Province, an 82-year-old man and the other in Khenchela province, an 85-year-old man.
 On 23 March, the balance sheet was 230 confirmed cases and 17 deaths, including 125 confirmed cases in Blida Province. 25 provinces are affected by the pandemic in Algeria.
 On 24 March, the balance is of 264 confirmed cases and 19 deaths, after recording 34 new cases according to the revelations of the spokesperson of the Scientific Committee for monitoring the evolution of the COVID-19 pandemic, Djamel Fourar. The two death cases concern a 72-year-old man and that of a 70-year-old immigrant, registered respectively in Tizi-Ouzou and Boumerdès Provinces.
 On 25 March, 38 new confirmed cases and two new deaths. The two new deaths are recorded, one in Tipaza Province, a man aged 45 years and the other in the Constantine Province, a woman aged 58 years.
 On 26 March, 65 new confirmed cases and four new deaths were recorded, bringing the number of confirmed cases to 367 and the number of deaths to 25, The four new deaths are recorded, two in the Constantine Province, a man aged 90 years and a woman of 58 years, a death in of Tizi Ouzou Province, a woman aged 53 years and a death in Blida Province, an ambulance driver in the Boufarik hospital.
 On 27 March, 42 new confirmed cases, including one death have been reported during the last 24 hours in Algeria, bringing the number of confirmed cases to 409 and that of deaths to 26, are spread across thirty-six (36) provinces, including 180 in Blida, which represents 44% of the global number of infected people. The new death is registered in Bordj Bou Arreridj province, a 71-year-old woman.
 On 28 March, 45 new confirmed cases and three new deaths were recorded. The deaths consist in a man aged 65 years from Algiers, a man aged 84 years from Médéa and a man aged 45 years from Mostaganem Province, the latter came after a visit from Spain.
 On 29 March, a total of 57 new cases and two  deaths have been recorded in the last 24 hours in Algeria, bringing the total number of confirmed cases to 511 and of deaths to 31.
 On 30 March, 73 new confirmed cases and 4 new deaths have been reported over the last 24 hours in Algeria, bringing the total number of confirmed cases to 584 and that of deaths to 35. The four new deaths are listed, one in Béjaïa Province, a man aged 59, one in the Blida Province, a man aged 69 and two in the Oran Province, a woman aged 63 and a 67-year-old man.
 On 31 March, 132 new confirmed cases and 9 new deaths have been recorded over the past 24 hours in Algeria, bringing the number of confirmed cases to 716 and that of deaths to 44. The 9 new deaths are recorded, four in Blida Province, men aged 32, 56, 72 and 73 respectively, two in Sétif Province, one in the Bordj Bou Arreridj Province, one in Oran Province and one in Tipaza Province.

April 2020 
 On 1 April, a total of 131 new confirmed cases of coronavirus (COVID-19) and 14 new deaths have been recorded over the last 24 hours, putting the total number of confirmed cases at 847 and that of deaths at 58. New deaths have been recorded, five in Algiers, and three in Blida Province, one in Relizane Province, one Ghardaïa Province, one in  Oum El Bouaghi Province, one in Médéa Province, one in  Tizi Ouzou Province, and one  Aïn Témouchent Province.
 On 2 April, a total of 139 confirmed new cases and 25 new deaths have been recorded in the last 24 hours, bringing the total number of confirmed cases to 986 and that of deaths to 86. The new deaths were recorded in the provinces of Blida (5 cases), Algiers (5), Setif (4), Medea (4), Ain Defla (2) and one death in the provinces of Tiaret, Oum El Bouaghi, Tipaza, Boumerdes, and Batna.
 On 3 April, 185 new confirmed cases and 22 new deaths have been recorded during the last 24 hours in Algeria, bringing the number of confirmed cases to 1,171 and that of deaths to 105.
 On 4 April, a total of 80 new confirmed cases and 25 new deaths have been recorded during the last 24 hours, bringing the number of confirmed cases to 1,251 and deaths to 130.
 On 5 April, 69 new confirmed cases and 22 new deaths recorded are recorded in 24 hours. The 22 new deaths are as listed, six recorded in Blida, six in Algiers, two in Bordj Bou Arréridj, one in each of Tizi Ouzou, Relizane, Annaba, Aïn Defla, Tipaza, Chlef, Tébessa and Adrar.
 On 6 April, 103 new confirmed cases and 21 new deaths have been recorded during the last 24 hours in Algeria, bringing the number of confirmed cases to 1,423 and that of deaths to 173. New deaths have been recorded in Algiers with 6 deaths, Oran (3), Blida (2), Bordj Bou Arreridj (2), Tissemssilt (2) and one case in Bejaïa, Jijel, Constantine, Biskra, Oum El Bouaghi and Ouargla.
 On 7 April, 45 new confirmed cases and 20 deaths were recorded in 24 hours. The 20 new deaths are recorded, 11 deaths in Blida, two in Algiers, one in Béjaïa, one in the Tizi Ouzou, one in Mostaganem, one in Bordj Bou Arreridj, one in Sétif, one in Boumerdès and one in Batna.
 On 8 April, 104 more people in Algeria have tested positive for coronavirus, and 12 others have died, taking the number of confirmed cases to 1572 and that of deaths to 205. 5 deaths in Blida, 3 in Algiers, and two (2) cases in Bejaia and one case, in the provinces of Tipaza and Constantine.
 On 9 April, 94 new confirmed cases have been reported in Algeria in the last 24 hours, bringing the number of confirmed cases to 1666, and 30 more deaths between 31 March and 9 April, raising the number of deaths to 235. The registered deaths during this period (March 31 and April 9) are distributed across ten provinces,  Algiers (13 cases), Blida (5 cases), Bejaia (2), Oran (2), Jijel (2), El-Oued (1), Batna (1), M'sila (1), Annaba (1).
 On 10 April, 95 new confirmed cases of coronavirus disease (COVID-19) have been reported in Algeria during the last 24 hours, while 21 more deaths have been recorded between 30 March and 10 April, taking the number of confirmed cases to 1761 and that of deaths to 256. Six deaths have been recorded in Blida, six in Algiers, one in each of Tizi Ouzou, Oran, Bouira, Tipaza, Boumerdès, Biskra, M'Sila, Djelfa and Mascara.
 On 11 April, 64 new confirmed cases of coronavirus (COVID-19) have been reported in Algeria over the last 24 hours bringing the total number of confirmed cases to 1825, while 19 new deaths have been recorded between March 27 and April 11, 7 of them in the past 48 hours, raising the number of deaths at 275.
 On 12 April, 89 new confirmed cases of coronavirus (COVID-19) have been recorded in Algeria during the last 24 hours, bringing the total number of confirmed cases up to 1914. 18 deaths between April 1–12, including 12 over the last 72 hours across 7 provinces, raising the number of deaths to 293.
 On 13 April, 69 new confirmed cases of coronavirus (COVID-19) have been recorded in Algeria during the last 24 hours, bringing the total number of confirmed cases up to 1983. 20 deaths, were also recorded across 10 provinces, raising the number of deaths to 313.
 On 14 April, 87 new confirmed cases of coronavirus  have been recorded in Algeria during the last 24 hours within 16 provinces, bringing the total number of confirmed cases up to 2070. 13 deaths, were also recorded, within 7 provinces (Algiers (4), Blida (2), M'sila (2), Tipaza (2), Bordj Bou Arréridj (1), Ghardaïa (1), Skikda (1)), raising the number of deaths to 326.
 On 15 April, the number of confirmed cases of coronavirus has risen to 2160 with a total of 90 new cases recorded in 21 provinces during the last 24 hours. 10 deaths were also recorded in the last 24 hours within 6 provinces as the following: Algiers (4), Blida (2), Oran (1), Jijel (1), Constantine (1) and Sidi Bel Abbes (1), bringing the total of deaths to 336.
 On 16 April, 108 new confirmed cases have been recorded during the last 24 hours, bringing the total number of confirmed cases up to 2268. 12 deaths across 8 provinces (Blida (3), Algiers (3), one death in each of Tipaza, Béjaïa, Skikda, Annaba, Khenchela and Ouargla) were also recorded, raising the number of deaths to 348.
 On 17 April, 150 new confirmed cases have been reported over the last 24 hours bringing the total number of confirmed cases to 2418, while 16 new deaths have been recorded between April 8 and April 16, raising the number of deaths to 364.
 On 18 April, 116 new confirmed cases have been reported over the last 24 hours bringing the total number of confirmed cases to 2534, while only 3 new deaths have been recorded in Blida, raising the number of deaths to 367.
 On 19 April, 95 new confirmed cases and 8 new deaths have been reported in Algeria, bringing the number of confirmed cases to 2629 and that of deaths to 375.  The Ministry of National Education announced Sunday the extension of the suspension of classes for the three education stages to 29 April.
 On 20 April, 89 new confirmed cases  and 9 new deaths over the last 24 hours have been recorded, bringing the number of confirmed cases to 2718 and that of deaths to 384.
 On 21 April, 93 new confirmed cases  and 08 new deaths have been reported in Algeria, bringing the number of confirmed cases to 2811 and that of deaths to 392.
 On 22 April, 99 new confirmed cases  and 10 new deaths have been reported in Algeria, bringing the number of confirmed cases to 2910 and that of deaths to 402. Algeria received a new donation from China made up of surgical masks, test kits and artificial breathing apparatuses as part of the fight against COVID-19.  
 On 23 April, 97 new confirmed cases, 5 new deaths, bringing the number of confirmed cases to 3007 and that of deaths to 407.
 On 24 April, 120 new confirmed cases have been reported, and 8 new deaths across 4 provinces (Algiers (5), one death  in each of Tipaza, Médéa and Ouargla), bringing the number of confirmed cases to 3127 and that of deaths to 415. The lockdown measures which were applied in nine provinces, subject to partial containment from 3 p.m. to 7 a.m., have been eased to run from 5 p.m. to 7 a.m.  The Blida province which was on total lockdown is subject now to partial lockdown from 2:00 p.m. to 7:00 a.m.
 On 25 April, 129 new confirmed cases have been reported, and 4 new deaths across 4 provinces (one death  in each of Tipaza, Sidi Bel Abbes, Tizi Ouzou and M'Sila), bringing the number of confirmed cases to 3256 and that of deaths to 419. Prime Minister Abdelaziz Djerad issued an instruction to ministerial departments and Republic's walis (governors of provinces) for the extension of activity sectors and business opening.
 On 26 April, 126 new confirmed cases have been reported, and 6 new deaths across 5 provinces (two cases in Blida and one death  in each of Sétif, Bordj Bou Arréridj, Tébessa and Bouira), bringing the number of confirmed cases to 3382 and that of deaths to 425.
 On 27 April, a total of 135 new confirmed cases and 7 new deaths have been recorded in the last 24 hours in Algeria, the new deaths have been recorded across 4 provinces (three cases in Blida, two in Algiers and one death  in each of Sétif and Boumerdès), bringing the whole number of confirmed cases to 3517 and that of fatalities to 432. The lockdown measures and the other relevant preventive measures to face the novel coronavirus (COVID-19) have been extended, for an additional period of 15 days (from April 30 to May 14).
 On 28 April, 132 new confirmed cases and five deaths were recorded in the last 24 hours in Algeria, the new deaths have been recorded across 4 provinces (two cases in Tiaret, and one death  in each of Sétif, Ouargla and Annaba), bringing the total number of confirmed cases to 3,649 and that of deaths to 437.
 On 29 April, 199 new confirmed cases and 7 deaths have been recorded in the last 24 hours in Algeria, the new deaths have been recorded across 5 provinces (two cases in each of  Sétif and  Bordj Bou Arréridj, and one death  in each of Tipaza, Ouargla and Adrar), taking the total number of confirmed cases to 3848 and that of death to 444. At the air base of Boufarik, Blida (50-km south of Algiers), Algeria receives medical equipment offered by Russia, as a contribution to Algeria's efforts to stem the spread of the coronavirus (COVID-19).
 On 30 April, 158 new confirmed cases and 6 deaths have been recorded in the last 24 hours in Algeria, the new deaths have been recorded across 3 provinces (three cases in Algiers and two cases in Sétif  and one death  in Djelfa), taking the total number of confirmed cases to 4006 and that of death to 450.

May 2020 
 On 1 May, a total of 148 new confirmed cases and 3 deaths were recorded in the last 24 hours in Algeria, bringing the total number of confirmed cases to 4,154 and that of deaths to 453. the 3 new deaths have been recorded in 3 provinces (one death in each of Bordj Bou Arréridj, Tizi Ouzou and Constantine).
 On 2 May, 141 new confirmed cases and 6 deaths were recorded, bringing the total to 4,295 confirmed cases and 459 deaths. The six new deaths were recorded in 5 provinces such as Bordj Bou Arréridj (2), Algiers (1), Tipaza (1), Tiaret (1) and Ouargla (1).
 On 3 May, 141 confirmed cases of coronavirus (COVID-19) and 4 deaths have been reported in the last 24 hours in Algeria, bringing the number of confirmed cases to 4474 and that of deaths to 463, the 4 new deaths  have been recorded in 4 provinces (one death in each of Blida, Algiers, Sétif and Ouargla). The current school year has been suspended and "the Council of Ministers has decided to submit proposals to finish the school year in the best interests of pupils and students, and the final decision will be made in next Sunday's Council of Ministers meeting.
 On 4 May, 174 new cases and 2 deaths were recorded, making the total 4648 confirmed cases and 465 deaths, one of them in Algiers and the other in Bordj Bou Arréridj.
 On 5 May, 190 new cases have been confirmed and 5 deaths were recorded bringing the total to 4838 confirmed cases and 470 deaths. The deaths were recorded in the following provinces: Blida (2),  Algiers (2) and Adrar (1).
 On 6 May, 159 new confirmed cases and 6 deaths were recorded, bringing the total to 4,997 confirmed cases and 476 deaths. The six new deaths were recorded in 6 provinces which are Algiers, Oran, Tipaza, Tiaret, Mascara and Khenchela.
 On 7 May, 185 new cases and 6 deaths have been recorded, bringing the total to 5,182 cases and 483 deaths. The deaths were recorded in: Béjaïa (2), Tipaza (1), Bordj Bou Arréridj (1), Tlemcen (1) and Ouargla (1).
 On 8 May, 187 new cases and 5 deaths have been recorded, making the total 5,369 cases and 488 deaths. The deaths were recorded in: Constantine (2), Algiers (1), Tipaza (1) and Ghardaïa (1).
 On 9 May, 189 new confirmed cases and 6 deaths were recorded, bringing the total to 5,558 confirmed cases and 494 deaths. The six new deaths were recorded in: Blida, Tipaza, Ouargla, Bouira, M'sila and Mila.
 On 10 May, 165 new confirmed cases and 8 deaths were recorded, bringing the total to 5,723 confirmed cases and 502 deaths. The 8 new deaths were recorded in: Sétif (2), Bordj Bou Arréridj (2), Ouargla (2), Blida, and Sidi Bel Abbes. The Council of ministers decided to postpone until September the baccalaureate and intermediate school certificate examinations in the second week of the same month, and canceled the primary school leaving examination while pupils and students will move up into the next classes in the three education cycles by calculating the averages of the first and second terms and reducing the admission average.  
 On 11 May, 168 new confirmed cases and 5 deaths were recorded, bringing the total to 5,981 confirmed cases and 507 deaths. The 5 new deaths were recorded in: Blida, Tiaret, Batna, Skikda and Sidi Bel Abbes.
 On 12 May, A total of 176 new confirmed COVID-19 cases, 157 recovered cases and 8 deaths were recorded in the last 24 hours in Algeria, bringing the total number of confirmed cases to 6,067 and that of deaths to 515, and number of recovered people reached 2,998. The deaths were recorded in: Batna (2), Blida, M'Sila, Djelfa, Mascara, Oum El Bouaghi and El Bayadh.
 On 13 May, 186 new confirmed COVID-19 cases, 60 recovered cases and 7 deaths were recorded in the last 24 hours in Algeria, bringing the total number of confirmed cases to 6,253 and that of deaths to 522, and number of recovered people reached 3,058. The 7 new deaths were recorded in: Algiers (2), Blida, Setif, Tlemcen, Ouargla and Tizi Ouzou.
 On 14 May, 189 new cases and 7 deaths have been recorded, making the total 6,442 confirmed cases and 529 deaths. The deaths were recorded in: Ain Defla (2), Oran, Béjaïa, Ouargla, Bouira and Tebessa. Minister of Health, Population and Hospital Reform Abderahmane Benbouzid said that wearing facemasks will become mandatory, if the spread of the COVID-19 pandemic in Algeria persists, and the situation is not under control.
 On 15 May, 187 new cases and 7 deaths have been recorded, making the total 6,629 cases and 536 deaths. The deaths were recorded in: Constantine (2), Algiers, Mila, Sidi Bel Abbes, Djelfa and Mascara.
 On 16 May, 192 new confirmed cases and 6 deaths were recorded, bringing the total to 6,821 confirmed cases and 542 deaths. The six new deaths were recorded in: Algiers (2), Setif, Constantine, Bordj Bou Arréridj and Médéa.
 On 17 May, 198 new cases and 6 deaths have been recorded, making the total 7,019 cases and 548 deaths. The deaths were recorded in: Algiers, Constantine, Bordj Bou Arréridj, Tiaret, Batna and Bouira. at this day, there is 19 deaths to the coronavirus (COVID-19) have been reported among the medical and paramedical staff in Algeria since the outbreak of the epidemic.
 On 18 May, 182 new confirmed cases and 7 deaths were recorded, bringing the total to 7,201 confirmed cases and 555 deaths. The 7 new deaths were recorded in: Setif (3), Algiers, Ain Defla, Bejaia and Sidi Bel Abbes.
 On 19 May, 176 new confirmed cases and 6 deaths were recorded, bringing the total to 7,377 confirmed cases and 561 deaths. The 6 new deaths were recorded in: Blida, Oran, Setif, Ouargla, Tiaret and Sidi Bel Abbes.
 On 20 May, 165 new confirmed cases and 7 deaths were recorded, bringing the total to 7,542 confirmed cases and 568 deaths. The 7 new deaths were recorded in: Algiers (2), Blida, Setif, Bordj Bou Arréridj, Médéa and El Bayadh.
 On 21 May, 186 new confirmed cases and 7 deaths were recorded, bringing the total to 7,728 confirmed cases and 575 deaths. The 7 new deaths were recorded in: Constantine (2), Algiers, Médéa, Ouargla, Tiaret and  Ain Temouchent. The Prime Ministry decide to suspend the traffic for all vehicles, including motorcycles, during the whole day of the 1st and 2nd days of Eid al Fitr holiday (24 and 25 May). This measure concerns all provinces and remains applicable even outside the hours of partial lockdown, scheduled from 13:00 pm  until the next day at 07:00 am.
 On 22 May, 190 new confirmed cases and 7 deaths were recorded, bringing the total to 7,918 confirmed cases and 582 deaths. The 7 new deaths were recorded in: Tipaza (2), Algiers, Setif, Constantine, Tiaret and Mascara.
 On 23 May, 195 new confirmed cases and 10 deaths were recorded, bringing the total to 8,113 confirmed cases and 592 deaths. The 10 new deaths were recorded in: Blida (2), Oran (2), Setif (2), Algiers, Tipaza, Béjaïa and Batna.
 On 24 May, 193 new confirmed cases and 8 deaths were recorded, bringing the total to 8,306 confirmed cases and 600 deaths. The 8 new deaths were recorded in: Algiers (2), Oran, Setif, Ouargla, Béchar, Laghouat and Naâma.
 On 25 May, 197 new confirmed cases and 9 deaths were recorded, bringing the total to 8,503 confirmed cases and 609 deaths. The 9 new deaths were recorded in: Tipaza, Ouargla, Tiaret, Skikda, Adrar, El Oued, Mostaganem, Mila and Tindouf.
 On 26 May, 194 new confirmed cases and 8 deaths were recorded, bringing the total to 8,697 confirmed cases and 609 deaths. The 8 new deaths were recorded in: Tiaret (2), Setif, Ain Defla, Bouira, Laghouat, El Oued and El Bayadh.
 On 27 May, 160 new confirmed cases and 6 deaths were recorded, bringing the total to 8,857 confirmed cases and 623 deaths. The 6 new deaths were recorded in: Setif (2), Constantine, Médéa, Mascara and Skikda.
 On 28 May, 140 new confirmed cases and 7 deaths were recorded, bringing the total to 8,997 confirmed cases and 630 deaths. The 7 new deaths were recorded in: Médéa (2), Algiers, Tiaret, M'sila, Sidi Bel Abbes and El Bayadh. The government decided to maintain the partial lockdown until June 13 as part of the measures to fight against the COVID-19 pandemic and to totally lift it in four provinces. Algeria will continue the use of the therapeutic protocol based on hydroxychloroquine against the new coronavirus (COVID-19).
 On 29 May, 137 new confirmed cases and 8 deaths were recorded, bringing the total to 9,134 confirmed cases and 638 deaths. The 8 new deaths were recorded in: Oran, Setif, Ouargla, Médéa, M'Sila, Mila, El Bayadh and Tamanrasset.
 On 30 May, 133 new confirmed cases and 8 deaths were recorded, bringing the total to 9,267 confirmed cases and 646 deaths. The 8 new deaths were recorded in: Algiers, Oran, Tipaza, Ouargla, Médéa, M'Sila, Laghouat and Ghardaïa.
 On 31 May, 127 new confirmed cases and 7 deaths were recorded, bringing the total to 9,394 confirmed cases and 653 deaths. The 7 new deaths were recorded in: Algiers, Setif, Ouargla, Tiaret, M'Sila, Laghouat and Chlef.

June 2020 
 On 1 June, 119 new confirmed cases and 8 deaths were recorded, bringing the total to 9,513 confirmed cases and 661 deaths. The 8 new deaths were recorded in: Blida, Algiers, Setif, Constantine, Batna, Adrar, El Oued and Souk Ahras.
 On 2 June, 113 new confirmed cases and 6 deaths were recorded, bringing the total to 9,626 confirmed cases and 667 deaths. The 6 new deaths were recorded in: Blida, Setif, Batna, M'Sila, Chlef and Souk Ahras.
 On 3 June, 107 new confirmed cases and 6 deaths were recorded, bringing the total to 9,733 confirmed cases and 673 deaths. The 6 new deaths were recorded in: Biskra (2), Algiers, Setif, Béjaïa and El Oued.
 On 4 June, 98 new confirmed cases and 8 deaths were recorded, bringing the total to 9,831 confirmed cases and 681 deaths. The 6 new deaths were recorded in: Blida, Setif, Béjaïa, Ouargla, Djelfa, Khenchela, Adrar and Souk Ahras.
 On 5 June, 104 new confirmed cases and 9 deaths were recorded, bringing the total to 9,935 confirmed cases and 690 deaths. The 9 new deaths were recorded in: M'Sila (2), Blida, Setif, Constantine Béjaïa, Béchar, Bouira and Souk Ahras.
 On 6 June, 115 new confirmed cases and 8 deaths were recorded, bringing the total to 10,050 confirmed cases and 698 deaths. The 8 new deaths were recorded in: Setif (2), Algiers, Constantine, Tipaza, Béchar, Boumerdès and Sidi Bel Abbes.
 On 7 June, 104 new confirmed cases and 9 deaths were recorded, bringing the total to 10,154 confirmed cases and 707 deaths. The 9 new deaths were recorded in: Algiers (2), Setif (2), Ouargla, Médéa, Boumerdès, El Oued and Ghardaïa.
 On 8 June, 111 new confirmed cases and 8 deaths were recorded, bringing the total to 10,265 confirmed cases and 715 deaths. The 8 new deaths were recorded in: Blida, Algiers, Setif, Ouargla, Batna, Djelfa, Ghardaïa and Tissemsilt.
 On 9 June, 117 new confirmed cases and 9 deaths were recorded, bringing the total to 10,382 confirmed cases and 724 deaths. The 9 new deaths were recorded in: Algiers (2), Bouira (2), Annaba, Biskra, Lagouat, El Oued and Jijel.
 On 10 June, 102 new confirmed cases and 8 deaths were recorded, bringing the total to 10,484 confirmed cases and 732 deaths. The 8 new deaths were recorded in: Blida, Algiers, Tipaza, Annaba, Djelfa, M'Sila, Ghardaïa and El Taref.
 On 11 June, 105 new confirmed cases and 9 deaths were recorded, bringing the total to 10,589 confirmed cases and 741 deaths. The 9 new deaths were recorded in: Setif, Oum El Bouaghi, Tiaret, M'Sila, Biskra, El Oued, Tebessa, Sidi Bel Abbes and Souk Ahras.
 On 12 June, 109 new confirmed cases and 10 deaths were recorded, bringing the total to 10,698 confirmed cases and 751 deaths. The 10 new deaths were recorded in: Setif (3), M'Sila (3), El Oued (2), Annaba and Tebessa.
 On 13 June, 112 new confirmed cases and 9 deaths were recorded, bringing the total to 10,810 confirmed cases and 760 deaths. The 9 new deaths were recorded in: Algiers (2), Setif (2), Tipaza, Tiaret, M'Sila, Mascara and Jijel.
 On 14 June, 109 new confirmed cases and 7 deaths were recorded, bringing the total to 10,919 confirmed cases and 767 deaths. The 7 new deaths were recorded in: Blida (2), El Oued (2), Setif, M'Sila and Tissemsilt.
 On 15 June, 112 new confirmed cases and 10 deaths were recorded, bringing the total to 11,031 confirmed cases and 777 deaths. The 10 new deaths were recorded in: Blida, Setif, Constantine, Béjaïa, Oum El Bouaghi, Tiaret, M'Sila, Bouira, Sidi Bel Abbes and Tissemsilt.
 On 16 June, 116 new confirmed cases and 11 deaths were recorded, bringing the total to 11,147 confirmed cases and 788 deaths. The 11 new deaths were recorded in: El Oued (2), Mila (2), Algiers, Setif, Tipaza, Bejaia,   Oum El Bouaghi, Batna and Bouira.
 On 17 June, 121 new confirmed cases and 11 deaths were recorded, bringing the total to 11,268 confirmed cases and 799 deaths. The 11 new deaths were recorded in: Tiaret (2), Mila (2), Blida, Setif, Annaba, M'Sila, Khenchela, El Oued and Souk Ahras.
 On 18 June, 117 new confirmed cases and 12 deaths were recorded, bringing the total to 11,385 confirmed cases and 811 deaths. The 12 new deaths were recorded in: Algiers, Setif, Ouargla, Béjaïa, Bordj Bou Arréridj, Tiaret, M'Sila, Skikda, Laghouat, Mila, Jijel and El Bayadh.
 On 19 June, 119 new confirmed cases and 14 deaths were recorded, bringing the total to 11,504 confirmed cases and 825 deaths. The 14 new deaths were recorded in: Tamanrasset (3), Blida (2), Setif (2), Biskra (2), Oum El Bouaghi, Annaba, Adrar, Tebessa and Mila.
 On 20 June, 127 new confirmed cases and 12 deaths were recorded, bringing the total to 11,631 confirmed cases and 837 deaths. The 12 new deaths were recorded in: Batna (2), Laghouat (2), Oran, Constantine, Ouargla, Béjaïa, M'Sila, Mascara, El Oued and Ghardaïa.
 On 21 June, 140 new confirmed cases and 8 deaths were recorded, bringing the total to 11771 confirmed cases and 845 deaths. The 8 deaths were recorded in: Setif, Batna, M'Sila, Mascara, Laghouat, Adrar, Bouira and Sidi Bel Abbes.
 On 22 June, 149 new confirmed cases and 7 deaths were recorded, bringing the total to 11920 confirmed cases and 852 deaths. The 7 deaths were recorded in: Setif (2), Béjaïa, Batna, Annaba, Djelfa and M'Sila.
 On 23 June, 156 new confirmed cases and 9 deaths were recorded, bringing the total to 12076 confirmed cases and 861 deaths.
 On 24 June, 171 new confirmed cases and 8 deaths were recorded, bringing the total to 12248 confirmed cases and 869 deaths.
 On 25 June, 197 new confirmed cases and 6 deaths were recorded, bringing the total to 12445 confirmed cases and 878 deaths.
 On 26 June, 240 new confirmed cases and 7 deaths were recorded, bringing the total to 12685 confirmed cases and 885 deaths.
 On 27 June, 283 new confirmed cases and 7 deaths were recorded, bringing the total to 12968 confirmed cases and 892 deaths.
 On 28 June, 305 new confirmed cases and 5 deaths were recorded, bringing the total to 13273 confirmed cases and 897 deaths.
 On 29 June, 298 new confirmed cases and 8 deaths were recorded, bringing the total to 13571 confirmed cases and 905 deaths.
 On 30 June, 336 new confirmed cases and 7 deaths were recorded, bringing the total to 13907 confirmed cases and 912 deaths.

July 2020 
 On 1 July, 365 new confirmed cases and 8 deaths were recorded, bringing the total to 14272 confirmed cases and 920 deaths.
 On 2 July, 385 new confirmed cases and 8 deaths were recorded, bringing the total to 14657 confirmed cases and 928 deaths.
 On 3 July, 413 new confirmed cases and 9 deaths were recorded, bringing the total to 15070 confirmed cases and 937 deaths.
 On 4 July, 430 new confirmed cases and 9 deaths were recorded, bringing the total to 15500 confirmed cases and 946 deaths.
 On 5 July, 441 new confirmed cases and 6 deaths were recorded, bringing the total to 15941 confirmed cases and 952 deaths.
 On 6 July, 463 new confirmed cases and 7 deaths were recorded, bringing the total to 16404 confirmed cases and 959 deaths.
 On 7 July, 475 new confirmed cases and 9 deaths were recorded, bringing the total to 16879 confirmed cases and 968 deaths.
 On 8 July, 469 new confirmed cases and 10 deaths were recorded, bringing the total to 17348 confirmed cases and 978 deaths. 1700 healthcare professionals in all services, have been contaminated by the COVID-19, since the outset of the outbreak in the country in February.
 On 9 July, 460 new confirmed cases and 10 deaths were recorded, bringing the total to 17808 confirmed cases and 988 deaths.
 On 10 July, 434 new confirmed cases and 8 deaths were recorded, bringing the total to 18242 confirmed cases and 996 deaths.
 On 11 July, 470 new confirmed cases and 8 deaths were recorded, bringing the total to 18712 confirmed cases and 1004 deaths.
 On 12 July, 483 new confirmed cases and 7 deaths were recorded, bringing the total to 19195 confirmed cases and 1011 deaths.
 On 13 July, 494 new confirmed cases and 7 deaths were recorded, bringing the total to 19689 confirmed cases and 1018 deaths.
 On 14 July, 527 new confirmed cases and 10 deaths were recorded, bringing the total to 20216 confirmed cases and 1028 deaths.
 On 15 July, 554 new confirmed cases and 12 deaths were recorded, bringing the total to 20770 confirmed cases and 1040 deaths.
 On 16 July, 585 new confirmed cases and 12 deaths were recorded, bringing the total to 21355 confirmed cases and 1052 deaths.
 On 17 July, 593 new confirmed cases and 5 deaths were recorded, bringing the total to 21948 confirmed cases and 1057 deaths.
 On 18 July, 601 new confirmed cases and 11 deaths were recorded, bringing the total to 22549 confirmed cases and 1068 deaths.
 On 19 July, 535 new confirmed cases and 10 deaths were recorded, bringing the total to 23084 confirmed cases and 1078 deaths.
 On 20 July, 607 new confirmed cases and 9 deaths were recorded, bringing the total to 23691 confirmed cases and 1087 deaths.
 On 21 July, 587 new confirmed cases and 13 deaths were recorded, bringing the total to 24278 confirmed cases and 1100 deaths.
 On 22 July, 594 new confirmed cases and 11 deaths were recorded, bringing the total to 24872 confirmed cases and 1111 deaths.
 On 23 July, 612 new confirmed cases and 13 deaths were recorded, bringing the total to 25484 confirmed cases and 1124 deaths.
 On 24 July, 675 new confirmed cases and 12 deaths were recorded, bringing the total to 26159 confirmed cases and 1136 deaths.
 On 25 July, 605 new confirmed cases and 10 deaths were recorded, bringing the total to 26764 confirmed cases and 1146 deaths.
 On 26 July, 593 new confirmed cases and 9 deaths were recorded, bringing the total to 27357 confirmed cases and 1155 deaths.
 On 27 July, 616 new confirmed cases and 8 deaths were recorded, bringing the total to 27973 confirmed cases and 1163 deaths.
 On 28 July, 642 new confirmed cases and 11 deaths were recorded, bringing the total to 28615 confirmed cases and 1174 deaths.
 On 29 July, 614 new confirmed cases and 12 deaths were recorded, bringing the total to 29229 confirmed cases and 1186 deaths.
 On 30 July, 602 new confirmed cases and 14 deaths were recorded, bringing the total to 29831 confirmed cases and 1200 deaths.
 On 31 July, 563 new confirmed cases and 10 deaths were recorded, bringing the total to 30394 confirmed cases and 1210 deaths.

August 2020 
 On 1 August, 556 new confirmed cases and 13 deaths were recorded, bringing the total to 30950 confirmed cases and 1223 deaths.
 On 2 August, 515 new confirmed cases and 8 deaths were recorded, bringing the total to 31465 confirmed cases and 1231 deaths.
 On 3 August, 507 new confirmed cases and 8 deaths were recorded, bringing the total to 31972 confirmed cases and 1239 deaths.
 On 4 August, 532 new confirmed cases and 9 deaths were recorded, bringing the total to 32504 confirmed cases and 1248 deaths.
 On 5 August, 551 new confirmed cases and 13 deaths were recorded, bringing the total to 33055 confirmed cases and 1261 deaths.
 On 6 August, 571 new confirmed cases and 12 deaths were recorded, bringing the total to 33626 confirmed cases and 1273 deaths.
 On 7 August, 529 new confirmed cases and 9 deaths were recorded, bringing the total to 34155 confirmed cases and 1282 deaths.
 On 8 August, 538 new confirmed cases and 11 deaths were recorded, bringing the total to 34693 confirmed cases and 1293 deaths. In the meeting of the High Security Council on 3 August 2020, it was decided to "adjust the partial lockdown hours from 11.00 p.m. to 6.00 a.m. in 29 provinces.". Boumerdes, Souk Ahras, Tissemsilt, Djelfa, Mascara, Oum El Bouaghi, Batna, Bouira, Relizane, Biskra, Khenchela, M'sila, Chlef, Sidi Bel Abbes, Medea, Blida, Bordj Bou Arreridj, Tipaza, Ouargla, Bechar, Algiers, Constantine, Oran, Setif, Annaba, Bejaia, Adrar, Laghouat and El Oued are the concerned provinces.
 On 9 August, 521 new confirmed cases and 9 deaths were recorded, bringing the total to 35214 confirmed cases and 1302 deaths. The prime minister Abdelaziz Djerad decided on the measures for the "gradual and monitored opening of beaches, recreation areas, hotels, cafés and restaurants", as from 9 August, while "respecting health protocols of prevention against the spread of Covid-19 pandemic,"
 On 10 August, 498 new confirmed cases and 10 deaths were recorded, bringing the total to 35712 confirmed cases and 1312 deaths.
 On 11 August, 492 new confirmed cases and 10 deaths were recorded, bringing the total to 36204 confirmed cases and 1322 deaths. 69 doctors and paramedics died from the COVID-19 and 4,025 have been contaminated since mars 2020.
 On 12 August, 495 new confirmed cases and 11 deaths were recorded, bringing the total to 36699 confirmed cases and 1333 deaths.
 On 13 August, 488 new confirmed cases and 8 deaths were recorded, bringing the total to 37187 confirmed cases and 1341 deaths.
 On 14 August, 477 new confirmed cases and 10 deaths were recorded, bringing the total to 37664 confirmed cases and 1351 deaths.
 On 15 August, 469 new confirmed cases and 9 deaths were recorded, bringing the total to 38133 confirmed cases and 1360 deaths.
 On 16 August, 450 new confirmed cases and 10 deaths were recorded, bringing the total to 38583 confirmed cases and 1370 deaths.
 On 17 August, 442 new confirmed cases and 9 deaths were recorded, bringing the total to 39025 confirmed cases and 1379 deaths.
 On 18 August, 419 new confirmed cases and 12 deaths were recorded, bringing the total to 39444 confirmed cases and 1391 deaths.
 On 19 August, 403 new confirmed cases and 11 deaths were recorded, bringing the total to 39847 confirmed cases and 1402 deaths.
 On 20 August, 411 new confirmed cases and 9 deaths were recorded, bringing the total to 40258 confirmed cases and 1411 deaths.
 On 21 August, 409 new confirmed cases and 7 deaths were recorded, bringing the total to 40667 confirmed cases and 1418 deaths.
 On 22 August, 401 new confirmed cases and 6 deaths were recorded, bringing the total to 41068 confirmed cases and 1424 deaths.
 On 23 August, 392 new confirmed cases and 11 deaths were recorded, bringing the total to 41460 confirmed cases and 1435 deaths.
 On 24 August, 398 new confirmed cases and 11 deaths were recorded, bringing the total to 41858 confirmed cases and 1446 deaths.
 On 25 August, 370 new cases, 218 recoveries and 10 deaths in last 24 hours.
 There were 14,100 new cases in August, raising the total number of confirmed cases to 44,494. The death toll increased by 300 to 1,510. At the end of August there were 11,740 active cases.

September 2020 
 There were 6,874 new cases in September, raising the total number of confirmed cases to 51,368. The death toll rose to 1,726. The number of recovered patients increased to 36,063, leaving 13,579 active cases at the end of the month.

October 2020 
 There were 6,574 new cases in October, raising the total number of confirmed cases to 57,942. The death toll rose to 1,964. The number of recovered patients increased to 40,201, leaving 15,777 active cases at the end of the month.

November 2020 
 On 3 November 2020, Algerian President Abdelmadjid Tebboune was reported to have COVID-19 after being flown to Germany for treatment. There were 25,257 new cases in November, raising the total number of confirmed cases to 83,199. The death toll rose to 2,431. The number of recovered patients increased to 53,809, leaving 26,959 active cases at the end of the month. Model-based simulations suggest that the 95% confidence interval for the time-varying reproduction number R t was lower than 1.0 in November and December.

December 2020 
 In December it was announced that Algeria intended to launch COVID-19 vaccinations in January 2021. President Tebboune returned from two months' hospitalization in Germany. There were 16,411 new cases in December, taking the total number of confirmed cases to 99,610. The death toll rose to 2,756. The number of recovered patients increased to 67,127, leaving 29,727 active cases at the end of the month.

January to March 2021 
 Less than two weeks after his return, President Tebboune flew back to Germany for more COVID-19 care.
 Mass vaccination commenced on 29 January, initially using 50,000 doses of the Sputnik V COVID-19 vaccine.
 There were 7,637 new cases in January, taking the total number of confirmed cases to 107,247. The death toll rose to 2,893. The number of recovered patients increased to 73,250, leaving 31,104 active cases at the end of the month.
 There were 5,753 new cases in February, taking the total number of confirmed cases to 113,000. The death toll rose to 2,985. The number of recovered patients increased to 78,004, leaving 32,011 active cases at the end of the month.
 As of 16 March, there were 115,410 confirmed cumulative cases and 3,040 deaths. There were 4,192 new cases in March, taking the total number of confirmed cases to 117,192. The death toll rose to 3,093. The number of recovered patients increased to 81,538, leaving 32,561 active cases at the end of the month.

April to June 2021 
 By 24 April 2021, health authority reported that there are 120,562 confirmed cases with 3,190 deaths since the outbreak of the pandemic.
 There were 5,119 new cases in April, taking the total number of confirmed cases to 122,311. The death toll rose to 3,261. The number of recovered patients increased to 85,249, leaving 33,801 active cases at the end of the month.
 There were 6,702 new cases in May, taking the total number of confirmed cases to 129,013. The death toll rose to 3,472. The number of recovered patients increased to 89,839, leaving 35,702 active cases at the end of the month.
 There were 10,613 new cases in June, taking the total number of confirmed cases to 139,626. The death toll rose to 3,716. The number of recovered patients increased to 97,089, leaving 38,821 active cases at the end of the month.

July to September 2021 
 Recently appointed Prime Minister Aymen Benabderrahmane tested positive on 10 July and was forced to work from home for seven days. There were 31,766 new cases in July, taking the total number of confirmed cases to 171,392. The death toll rose to 4,254. The number of recovered patients increased to 115,335, leaving 51,803 active cases at the end of the month.
 There were 24,688 new cases in August, taking the total number of confirmed cases to 196,080. The death toll rose to 5,269. The number of recovered patients increased to 133,395, leaving 57,416 active cases at the end of the month.
 There were 7,279 new cases in September, taking the total number of confirmed cases to 203,359. The death toll rose to 5,812. The number of recovered patients increased to 139,309, leaving 58,238 active cases at the end of the month.

October to December 2021 
 There were 3,093 new cases in October, bringing the total number of confirmed cases to 206,452. The death toll rose to 5,920. The number of recovered patients increased to 141,667, leaving 58,865 active cases at the end of the month.
 There were 4,079 new cases in November, bringing the total number of confirmed cases to 210,531. The death toll rose to 6,071. The number of recovered patients increased to 144,450, leaving 60,010 active cases at the end of the month.
 Algeria's first case of the omicron variant was confirmed on 14 December.
 There were 7,901 new cases in December, bringing the total number of confirmed cases to 218,432. The death toll rose to 6,276. The number of recovered patients increased to 150,084, leaving 62,072 active cases at the end of the month. Modelling by WHO's Regional Office for Africa suggests that due to under-reporting, the true cumulative number of infections by the end of 2021 was around 20 million while the true number of COVID-19 deaths was around 21,491.

January to March 2022 
 There were 32,342 new cases in January, raising the total number of confirmed cases to 250,774. The death toll rose to 6,566. The number of recovered patients increased to 167,005, leaving 77,203 active cases at the end of the month.
 There were 14,081 new cases in February, bringing the total number of confirmed cases to 264,855. The death toll rose to 6,831. The number of recovered patients increased to 177,437, leaving 80,587 active cases at the end of the month.
 There were 816 new cases in March, bringing the total number of confirmed cases to 265,671. The death toll rose to 6,874. The number of recovered patients increased to 178,288, leaving 80,509 active cases at the end of the month.

April to June 2022 
 There were 111 new cases in April, raising the total number of confirmed cases to 265,782. The death toll rose to 6,875. The number of recovered patients increased to 178,358, leaving 80,549 active cases at the end of the month.
 There were 91 new cases in May, raising the total number of confirmed cases to 265,873. The death toll remained unchanged. The number of recovered patients increased to 178,408, leaving 80,590 active cases at the end of the month.
 There were 214 new cases in June, raising the total number of confirmed cases to 266,087. The death toll remained unchanged. The number of recovered patients increased to 178,537, leaving 80,675 active cases at the end of the month.

July to December 2022 
 There were 1,367 new cases in July, raising the total number of confirmed cases to 267,454. The death toll rose to 6,876. The number of recovered patients increased to 179,464, leaving 81,114 active cases at the end of the month.
 The total number of confirmed cases rose to 270,838 in October. The death toll rose to 6,881. The number of recovered patients increased to 182,421, leaving 81,536 active cases at the end of the month.
 The total number of confirmed cases rose to 271,090 in November. The death toll remained unchanged.

January to December 2023 
 The total number of confirmed cases rose to 271,376 in January and 271,440 in February. The death toll remained unchanged. The number of recovered patients increased to 182,743 in January and 182,791 in February, leaving 81,752 active cases at the end of January and 81,768 at the end of Februry.

Statistics

Graphs

Cumulative number of cases

New cases per day

Deaths per day

Confirmed cases, deaths and recoveries per province

See also 
 COVID-19 pandemic in Africa
 COVID-19 pandemic by country and territory
 COVID-19 vaccination in Algeria

References

 
Algeria
2020 in Algeria
2021 in Algeria
2020 disasters in Algeria
2021 disasters in Algeria